ATOW1996 is one of the northernmost documented points of land on Earth. It was discovered by and named after the (American) Top of the World Expedition of 1996.

A non-permanent island even farther north—at —was noted in a Twin Otter flyover by the 2001 Return to the Top of the World Expedition (RTOW2001). This expedition also confirmed the continuing existence of ATOW1996.

The American Top of the World Expedition of 1996 was able to locate what they thought was Oodaaq Island, but doubts remain because of the inconsistency between the island they reached, "ATOW1996," and those recorded by the original discoverers of Oodaaq. The coordinates for ATOW1996 are actually further north than those for Oodaaq, so it currently holds the record for the most northerly point of land. An expedition was planned for 2003 to confirm this island's existence, and to clarify all other outstanding issues.

Whether that islet is permanent has not yet been confirmed.

See also
Stjernebannertinde

References 
Xefer.com

Uninhabited islands of Greenland